The Yangluo Yangtze River Bridge is a suspension bridge over the Yangtze River in Wuhan, Hubei, China. The bridge carries the G70 Fuzhou–Yinchuan Expressway and G4201 Wuhan Ring Expressway over the Yangtze River and provides easy access to both sides of the river as part of a larger plan to promote development in the eastern portion of the city. Construction on the bridge began on November 4, 2003, and it opened to traffic on December 26, 2007.

History
The Yangluo Bridge was the fourth bridge constructed over the Yangtze in Wuhan. The first was the Wuhan Yangtze River Bridge, known locally as the First Bridge, built in 1957. This remained the only land link across the river for the next four decades and it became increasingly congested as the city grew. To alleviate the crowding on the bridge and promote further development in the city, Wuhan's government began an ambitious program in the early 1990s to upgrade the city's infrastructure by building new bridges and expressways around the city. Two further road crossings near the centre of the city, the Second Wuhan Yangtze River Bridge and the Baishazhou Bridge, were completed in 1995 and 2000 respectively. Together with the 10 km of new expressway constructed concurrently the bridge was the final major portion of the G4201 Wuhan Ring Expressway.

Design
The bridge was designed by the China Communications Construction Company and built with assistance from Dorman Long, a UK-based heavy-lift construction contractor.

The bridge's deck is made of prefabricated concrete sections with an epoxy asphalt roadbed. It includes a 3-metre (9.8 ft) thick steel brace structure with girders at 14 metre intervals under the main deck to stiffen the bridge against the wind. The portion of the cables over the shorter northern approach span include an additional eight strands to withstand the greater force exerted on them because of the smaller ratio in relation to the length of the main span.
 

See also

 List of bridges in China
 Yangtze River bridges and tunnels
 List of longest suspension bridge spans

References

External links
Aerial photo of the bridge

Suspension bridges in China
Bridges in Wuhan
Bridges completed in 2007
Bridges over the Yangtze River